Championship Manager 2011 is an association football manager simulation video game developed by Beautiful Game Studios and published by Eidos Interactive. It was released for iOS on October 14, 2010.

See also
Football Manager 2011

References
 

2010 video games
Association football management video games
iOS games
Video games developed in the United Kingdom